A geodesic is a curve representing in some sense the shortest path between two points on a surface.

Geodesic may also refer to:

 Geodesic (general relativity), generalization of the notion of a "straight line" to curved spacetime
 An adjective meaning "related to geodesy", the Earth science of accurately measuring and understanding Earth's geometric shape
 Geodesic dome, a hemispherical lattice-shell structure made from triangles, the shape of which is called a geodesic polyhedron

See also
 
 Geodetic (disambiguation)